Matthias Mauritz (13 November 1924 – 21 November 2016) was a German international footballer who played for Fortuna Düsseldorf and competed in the 1952 Summer Olympics and in the 1956 Summer Olympics. He was born in Düsseldorf.

International career
Mauritz made his debut for West Germany on 20 May 1959 in a friendly match against Poland, at 34 years of age.

References

Further reading
 Werner Raupp: Toni Turek – "Fußballgott". Eine Biographie. Hildesheim: Arete Verlag 2019 (1., rev. version), passim (esp. p. 73–97).

External links
 

1924 births
2016 deaths
Footballers from Düsseldorf
German footballers
Germany international footballers
Association football forwards
Fortuna Düsseldorf players
Olympic footballers of Germany
Olympic footballers of the United Team of Germany
Footballers at the 1952 Summer Olympics
Footballers at the 1956 Summer Olympics
West German male tennis players
West German footballers